The 46th Infantry Battalion of the Philippine Army is an organic unit of the 8th Infantry (Storm Troopers) Division. Their primary task is to secure the peace and order in the areas of Eastern Visayas, especially the Province of Western Samar which was noted for its deteriorated peace and order situation.
Currently, the 500-man-battalion are garrisoned and stationed at Brgy Polangi, Calbiga, Samar.

Equipment:
M16 Rifle
M4 Carbine
M14 Rifle
M1911 Pistol
M60 Machine Gun

Battalions of the Philippines
Military units and formations established in 2003